The Northern Shuswap Tribal Council is a First Nations government in the Canadian province of British Columbia.  Based in the Cariboo District of the Central Interior, it is one of two tribal councils of the Secwepemc people, the other being the Shuswap Nation Tribal Council of the Thompson-Shuswap region farther south.

Member governments

Canim Lake Band (Tsq'escen')
Soda Creek/Deep Creek Band (Xat'sull/Cm'etem)
Williams Lake Indian Band (T'exelc)
Canoe Creek Band/Dog Creek Indian Band (Stswecem'c/Xgat'tem)

See also

Shuswap Nation Tribal Council
Secwepemc
Shuswap language (Secwepemcstin)
List of tribal councils in British Columbia

External links
Northern Shuswap Tribal Council Homepage
Shuswap Nation homepage

Secwepemc
First Nations tribal councils in British Columbia